Colobodus is an extinct genus of Triassic-aged bony fish of the family Colobodontidae, and order Perleidiformes.

See also 

 Prehistoric fish
 List of prehistoric bony fish

References 

Prehistoric bony fish genera
Prehistoric neopterygii
Triassic fish of Asia
Triassic fish of Europe